Bostegan may refer to:
 Bostegan, Hormozgan